The Columbia Daily Tribune, commonly referred to as the Columbia Tribune or the Tribune, is one of two daily newspapers in Columbia, Missouri, the other being the Columbia Missourian. It is the only daily newspaper in Columbia whose circulation is verified by the Alliance for Audited Media (AAM), and it has been a member of that since 1915. The newspaper was owned by the Watson/Waters family from 1905 to 2016.

Although written to serve the Columbia Metropolitan Area, it is the most widely circulated newspaper in the region of Mid-Missouri. The paper is a broadsheet delivered mornings seven days a week.

History
 
The Tribune was founded in September 12, 1901, by former University of Missouri student Charles Monro Strong with assistance from Barratt O’Hara as the first daily newspaper in Columbia. Its offices were on the third floor of the Stone Building at 15 S. Ninth St.

Before 1901, news was offered by three weeklies: the Missouri Intelligencer, The Columbia Patriot and The Columbia Statesman. In 1902, Earnest M. Mitchell joined and they moved it to the Whittle Building at 911 E. Broadway Street Suite A (now home to KOPN). Mitchell bought Strong out in 1905 but died shortly thereafter from typhoid fever. In 1905, Edwin Moss Watson bought the newspaper.  His nephew, Henry "Jack" Waters, Jr., became publisher of the paper upon Watson's death in 1937, when Watson's sister, Margaret Watson Waters (Waters, Jr.'s mother), inherited the paper. In 1966, Henry "Hank" Waters, III succeeded his father and continued to operate the Tribune until December 31, 2010.

On January 1, 2011, Waters, III's two youngest children, Andy and Lizabeth, bought out four other family members to take full ownership of the company. Vicki Russell, Waters, III's wife, became the publisher—the first woman to ever hold that position. Andy became president and general manager. Waters, III took the title of publisher emeritus, but will still continue to write editorials. 

The Waters family sold the newspaper to GateHouse Media in 2016. GateHouse Media's parent company, New Media Investment Group, subsequently acquired Gannett Co., Inc. in 2019
, and the combined company assumed the Gannett name. 

In 2017, the Columbia Daily Tribune moved to a morning delivery format for all 7 days. The prices rose to a dollar for weekdays and Saturdays and 2 dollars for Sundays.

Environment
The Tribune is an environmentally friendly newspaper, using in excess of 90% recycled newsprint. On June 11, 2008, the Columbia Tribune reported that it is the state leader in use of recycled newsprint.

Game Over
Started in 2006, Game Over was a video game themed blog and weekly column in the Columbia Tribune. On December 31, 2006 the Tribune reported that the Game Over article Wii’s democracy makes mockery of meritocracy generated 16,766 hits, the ninth most of the year for their site. The column was originally written by Greg Miller, but in 2007, he moved on to work for IGN. Miller was replaced by Paul Dziuba, who was hired specifically for the column.

As of February 4, 2009, Game Over is no longer published.

See also
Columbia Missourian
 Ryan Ferguson (wrongful conviction)

References

External links

Newspapers published in Columbia, Missouri
Newspapers published in Missouri
Publications established in 1901
1901 establishments in Mississippi